Mick Peck is a professional award-winning magician based in Auckland, New Zealand.

He is a member of The Magic Circle of London, the world's most prestigious magic organisation and the President of the Brotherhood of Auckland Magicians.

Peck was inspired by watching magicians Paul Daniels and David Copperfield on television and presented his first magic show at the age of thirteen while at intermediate school.

He appeared on the cover of The New Zealand Herald Canvas magazine for the feature by Alan Perrott entitled "Hey Presto! - Why There's Still Room For Old-Fashioned Magic", was profiled in the Sunday Star-Times Sunday magazine for the feature "Revealing the Tricks of the Magician's Trade" by Jeremy Olds, and in Metro for the feature "Inside the Inner Circle of the Brotherhood of Auckland Magicians" by Sir Bob Harvey.

Peck is a recipient of the Auckland Chamber of Commerce Awesome Service Award, presented for providing inspirational customer service. The Awesome Service Award is supported by NewstalkZB and the Sunday Star-Times; nominations are made by customers and winners judged by Auckland Chamber of Commerce Chief Executive Michael Barnett ONZM.

He has been convention chairman for two New Zealand International Magicians Conventions (the 24th in 2004 and the 30th in 2010).

In 2012 Peck became the Editor of Inside Entertainment, the monthly membership magazine of the Variety Artists Club of New Zealand, an organisation formed in 1966 for entertainers and performing artists. In 2014 he was elected Vice-President of the Variety Artists Club.  Peck is also the producer of the annual Amazing VAC Variety Show, held in Auckland theatres.

In 2013 he co-founded VanishLive with Paul Romhany.  VanishLive is the online presence of Vanish magazine, an international trade magazine for the magic industry read by over 80,000 magicians. VanishLive features a daily roundup of global magic news, articles and reviews of magic tricks, books and DVDs.

In 2014 he was presented with a special award from Magic New Zealand "in recognition of his long term service and outstanding contribution to the magic fraternity of New Zealand".

In 2016 he was chosen as the official magician to perform at the New Zealand premiere magic-heist film Now You See Me 2.

In 2016 he was named Variety Entertainer of the Year by the Variety Artists Club of New Zealand.

In October 2018 he was presented with a Presidential Citation from the Brotherhood of Auckland Magicians Inc in recognition of his work with the annual Magic Moments Family Comedy Magic Show, which acts as a fundraiser to non-profit organisations.

In November 2020 he was named one of the best dressed men in New Zealand show business on David Hartnell MNZM's Best Dressed List.

In August 2021 he was elected to the role of President of the Brotherhood of Auckland Magicians Inc.

Recognition

 2018 : Presidential Citation : Brotherhood of Auckland Magicians
 2016 : New Zealand Variety Entertainer of the Year, Variety Artists Club of New Zealand
 2016 : Franklin Service Hero Award, The Post, Franklin and North Waikato
 2014 : Special Award For Outstanding Contribution to NZ Magic, Magic New Zealand
 2014 : New Zealand's Top Children's Entertainer Award, Variety Artists Club of New Zealand
 2013 : Special Award of Appreciation, Variety Artists Club of New Zealand
 2011 : New Zealand's Top Children's Entertainer Award, Variety Artists Club of New Zealand
 2011 : Auckland Chamber of Commerce Awesome Service Award
 1995 : Shore City Magicians Club Supporters Cup for Most Improved Magician

References

External links

 Hybrid Tech Is Like Magic, Mick Peck Driven Magazine, Stuff Online, 2021
 Comrades in Wands : The Brotherhood of Auckland Magicians Turns 75, The Spinoff, 2021
 Inside the Inner Circle of the Brotherhood of Auckland Magicians, Metro Magazine, Spring 2021
 
 An Auckland Magician With A Sleight Of Hand Wins Award, Stuff Online, October 2018
 Magic Mick - Tricks Are His Trade, Business to Business interview, 2017
 Interview : Billy T James' Death Left Huge Gap In New Zealand Culture, New Zealand Herald, 2017
 Magician Receives Prestigious Accolade, Franklin Life, 2016
 Celebrity Couch : Mick Peck, Franklin Life, 2016
 Paul Daniels Leaves Lasting Impression on Kiwi Magician Mick Peck, Stuff Online, 2016
 Mick Peck Granted Access to Magic Circle, Stuff Online, 2016
 Revealing The Tricks of the Magicians Trade, Sunday Star-Times Sunday Magazine, 2015
 
 Hey Presto! Why There's Still Room For Old-Fashioned Magic, New Zealand Herald Canvas Magazine, 2011
 Working His Magic, Franklin County News article, 2013
 Mick Peck Magic Website
 Mr Magic Website

New Zealand magicians
People from Auckland
Living people
Year of birth missing (living people)